The Rocky Horror Picture Show: Let's Do the Time Warp Again (also known as The Rocky Horror Picture Show Event and/or simply The Rocky Horror Picture Show) is a 2016 American musical comedy television film. It is a tribute to and remake of the cult classic 1975 film of the same name and directed by Kenny Ortega, using the original script written by Richard O'Brien and Jim Sharman.

Starring an ensemble cast led by Laverne Cox, the film premiered on the Fox network on October 20, 2016.

Plot 

The plot of the tribute is fundamentally identical to the original film, with some additional scenes wrapped around the film. These scenes show several people attending a theatrical showing of The Rocky Horror Picture Show, and subsequently are used to introduce some of the audience participation elements from the original film (such as throwing toilet paper on the line "Great Scott!").

Cast 
 Laverne Cox as Dr. Frank-N-Furter, the Mad Scientist.
 Victoria Justice as Janet Weiss, the Heroine
 Ryan McCartan as Brad Majors, the Hero
 Staz Nair as Rocky Horror, Frank's Creation
 Annaleigh Ashford as Columbia, the Groupie
 Adam Lambert as Eddie, the Ex-Delivery Boy
 Reeve Carney as Riff-Raff, the Handyman
 Christina Milian as Magenta, the Domestic Servant
 Ivy Levan as Trixie, the Usherette
 Ben Vereen as Dr. Everett von Scott, the Rival Scientist
 Tim Curry as the Narrator/Criminologist (Curry famously portrayed Dr. Frank-N-Furter in the original film).
 Jayne Eastwood as The Butler
 Jeff Lillico as Ralph Hapschatt
 Kelly Van der Burg as Betty Hapschatt-Munroe
 Sal Piro as The Photographer

Musical numbers 

 "Science Fiction/Double Feature" - Trixie
 "Dammit Janet" - Brad, Janet, and Chorus
 "There's a Light (Over at the Frankenstein Place)" - Janet, Brad, Riff Raff, and Chorus
 "The Time Warp" - Riff Raff, Magenta, The Criminologist, Columbia, and Transylvanians
 "Sweet Transvestite" - Frank
 "The Sword of Damocles" - Rocky
 "I Can Make You a Man" - Frank
 "Hot Patootie – Bless My Soul" - Eddie
 "I Can Make You a Man" (reprise) - Frank, Janet, and Transylvanians
 "Touch-a, Touch-a, Touch-a, Touch Me" - Janet with Magenta, Columbia, and Rocky
 "Once in a While" (extended cut) - Brad
 "Eddie" - Dr. Scott, The Criminologist, Janet, Frank, and Columbia
 "Planet Schmanet Janet (Wise Up Janet Weiss)" - Frank, Janet, Brad, and Dr. Scott
 "Rose Tint My World" - Columbia, Rocky, Janet, and Brad
 "Fanfare/Don't Dream It, Be It" - Frank
 "Wild and Untamed Thing" - Frank and Riff Raff
 "I'm Going Home" - Frank
 "The Time Warp" (reprise) - Riff Raff and Magenta
 "Super Heroes" - Brad, Janet, and Chorus
 "Science Fiction/Double Feature" (reprise) - Trixie and Eddie

Production 

Plans for a remake at Fox date back to 2002, when a 2003 release date was under consideration to mark the 30-year anniversary of the play which spawned the film, a remake for which former Broadway producer Gail Berman would have been involved as co-producer. MTV had also planned a remake, set for 2008 and for which Berman was again tapped to produce, but those plans also fell through.

On April 10, 2015, it was announced that Kenny Ortega, best known for directing the film Hocus Pocus, the High School Musical trilogy, and Michael Jackson's This Is It, would direct the remake. On October 21, 2015, Emmy Award nominee Laverne Cox, best known for her role as prisoner Sophia Burset on Netflix's prison comedy-drama Orange Is the New Black, joined the cast to play Dr. Frank-N-Furter, the mad-scientist role originated by Tim Curry in the 1970s. Lou Adler, who produced the original film, also co-produced the remake, along with Gail Berman and Kenny Ortega; Ortega choreographed the film in addition to directing and producing. The creative team planned "to stick faithfully to the text and the score of the original but greatly re-imagine the story visually".

Much of the film was shot at Toronto's Casa Loma, being used for both Frank N. Furter's castle and the "Castle" movie theatre where the audience participation scenes and Ivy Levan's performance of "Science Fiction/Double Feature" were filmed. A theatre marquee was temporarily erected at the front entrance for these scenes.

An unreleased virtual reality experience was in development at the time. A 360-degree video camera rig can be seen in a behind-the-scenes video released by Fox during a marketing promotion. However, the project was stopped for unknown reasons.

Release
The world premiere of the film was on October 18, 2016 at MIPCOM. The film premiered on Fox on October 20, 2016. The first 25 minutes of the film were screened at San Diego Comic-Con, as well as RKO Con 2, a Rocky Horror convention in Providence, Rhode Island.

The Rocky Horror Picture Show: Let's Do the Time Warp Again was released on DVD on December 6, 2016. An extended cut of the film was included featuring deleted scenes and the frequently excised song "Once in a While", as sung by Brad.

Reception

Viewership
The movie drew 4.95 million viewers, with a 1.7 rating and a 6 share in the 18-49 demographic.

Critical reception
The special received mixed to negative reviews, although Cox's performance was mostly praised.  Many critics agreed that the production would have been better if it were live, raising questions why Fox decided not to do it live, given the success the network had with Grease: Live. On Rotten Tomatoes, it has a 28% score based on 40 reviews; the critical consensus states, "Laverne Cox's fabulous portrayal of Frank N. Furter leads a strong ensemble effort, but the stars can't infuse this reimagining with enough energy, creativity, and quirk to make TRHPS: Let's Do the Time Warp Again a worthwhile endeavor." On Metacritic, the film has a 55 out of 100 rating, based on 23 critics, indicating "mixed or average reviews".

Esther Zuckerman of The A.V. Club felt that the remake focused too much on the weirdness in the original film without acknowledging the campiness it had been filmed with. Viewers who had never seen the original film would be confused by the movie-within-a-movie approach used in the remake. Matt Tamanini of Broadwayworld.com said that the remake "was a strikingly disappointing missed opportunity" that "felt far more like a production on Glee than the actual production of Rocky Horror on Glee did", although he did praise the casting of Cox, saying "In the long history of The Rocky Horror Show, the musical has broken down doors and helped pave the way for an era of LGBT acceptance. So for Cox to step into Tim Curry's iconic fishnets is a victory in its own right."

Awards
The program was nominated for the GLAAD Media Award for Outstanding TV Movie or Limited Series.

International broadcasts 
The film was scheduled to be broadcast in New Zealand on TV3 on October 24, 2016, three days after its original broadcast. In UK, the film was first broadcast on October 28, 2016 on Sky Cinema Premiere.

References

External links 
 
 The Rocky Horror Picture Show: Let's Do the Time Warp Again at Rotten Tomatoes
 2016 film teaser at Facebook

2010s American television specials
2010s musical comedy films
2010s dance films
2016 LGBT-related films
2010s screwball comedy films
2016 in American television
2016 television films
2016 television specials
American comedy horror films
American dance films
Remakes of American films
American LGBT-related films
American musical comedy films
American rock music films
American rock musicals
American science fiction television films
Films about cannibalism
Cross-dressing in American films
English-language television shows
Films based on adaptations
Films based on multiple works
Metafictional works
Films directed by Kenny Ortega
Films set in 1971
Films set in the 1970s
Films shot in Toronto
Fox network original films
Fox television specials
Horror film remakes
LGBT-related comedy horror films
LGBT-related musical comedy films
Mad scientist films
Musical television films
Rocky Horror
Television remakes of films
Transgender-related films
Musical film remakes
LGBT-related television specials
Science fiction musical films
2010s English-language films
2010s American films
LGBT-related science fiction films